Handan is a prefecture-level city located in the southwest of Hebei province, China. The southernmost prefecture-level city of the province, it borders Xingtai on the north, and the provinces of Shanxi on the west, Henan on the south and Shandong on the east.  At the 2010 census, its population was 9,174,683 inhabitants whom 2,845,790 lived in the built-up (or metro) area made of 5 urban districts. Yongnian District in Handan and Shahe City in Xingtai have largely formed into a single conurbation.

Handan is one of the oldest cities in China, first settled in 6500 BC by the Cishan culture. Throughout the city's long history, it contributed significantly to Chinese culture, serving as the capital of State of Zhao, was northern China's political, economic and cultural center, and home to Tai chi and the first compass, made from stones collected in the nearby Mount Ci (magnet mountain). Handan is designated as one of China's National Famous Historical and Cultural Cities.

Etymology 
The city's name, Handan, has remained unchanged for over 2,000 years. The name first appeared during the reign of King Zhou of Shang, in the chronicle Bamboo Annals.

A dictionary from the Tang dynasty explained that "Han" is the name of a nearby mountain (Hanshan), and "Dan" meant "the terminus of a mountain" with an added radical denoting a city. Together, "Handan" means "the city at the terminus of Mount Han". This explanation has been widely accepted until the discoveries of jade writings in Houma, Shanxi in 1965, where the "Dan" in Handan was spelt "", meaning red. This then lead to another explanation that Handan was named so because Mount Han appeared reddish-purple in color.

The different spellings of the city's name consolidated into the modern spelling in Qin dynasty.

History 

Handan, once well-defended from southern attack by a bend in the Zhang River, was a city of the state of Zhao during the Warring States Period (5th–3rd centuries BCE) of Chinese history. It was their second capital, after Zhongmu. King Wuling of Zhao turned Zhao into one of the Qin state's most stalwart foes, pioneering the use of walls to secure new frontiers (which would inspire the eventual construction of the Great Wall of China). The city was conquered by the State of Qin after the virtual annexation of Zhao by Qin except for the Dai Commandery. The first emperor of China, Qin Shi Huang was born in Handan, the child of a statesman from the state of Qin and after successfully conquering Zhao he ordered all enemies of his mother to be buried alive. The conquest of Zhao, particularly the Qin siege of Handan, is featured extensively in Chen Kaige's classic film, The Emperor and the Assassin.

At the beginning of the Han dynasty, Handan was Liu Bang's base for suppressing Chen Xi's rebellion in 197 and 196 BCE; it was still regarded as a regional center of culture and commerce at the end of the dynasty in the early 3rd century CE. It slowly declined, perhaps because of the numerous battles that ravaged northern China following the Han Dynasty, but maintained a reputation for its fine Cizhou ware well into the Qing dynasty (1644–1911). It was also the birthplace in the 19th century of Yang-style tai chi, one of Tai Chi's five major schools.

Though much of Handan's ancient history is no longer visible, it still has some attractions, deriving from the many Chinese idioms that the city inspired, such as the road into which Lin Xiangru, courier of the precious Heshibi, backed in order to let his nemesis Lian Po pass first, as well as the location in which Lian Po begged for Lin Xiangru's forgiveness. Modern-day Congtai Park is located on the site of the historical Zhao court. Next to Congtai Park is the legendary "Xuebu Bridge", or "Learning to Walk Bridge". Legend has it that a noble from the state of Yan heard of a particularly elegant manner of walking unique to Handan. Arriving in Handan, he spent weeks trying to master the Handan style of walking on a bridge, only to fail. In the process, however, he had forgotten how to walk normally and had to crawl back to Yan. This story inspired the Chinese expression, "to learn the walk of Handan" (Hándān xué bù), which means learning something difficult too intensely, thereby forgetting the basics in the process.

The nearby Xiangtangshan Caves contain massive Buddha statues carved into the mountainside, some dating to the 6th century, many of which were severely damaged by invading Japanese forces during World War II. At that time, Handan was prized by the Japanese invaders for its coal reserves.

In 2007, Handan was the location of China's largest-ever bank robbery.

Administration 

The municipal executive, legislative and judiciary are situated in Congtai District (Cóngtái Qū), as well as the CPC and Public Security bureaux.

Climate 
Handan has a monsoon-influenced humid continental climate/semi-arid climate (Köppen Dwa/BSk), with strong monsoonal influence, typical of the North China Plain. A majority of the normal annual precipitation of  occurs in July and August.

Economy 

Handan has witnessed rapid growth over the past 20 years. Industrial growth in the city has focused on communication and transport activities. Handan is a major producer of coal and steel, with Coal mines at Fengfeng providing power for Handan's iron, steel and textile mills. Chemical and cement plants along with other industries also benefit.  Local agriculture produces maize, pomegranates and eggs. Handan also has a growing services sector, with retail, banking and trading making up 40% of the economy. The GDP per capita in Renminbi was estimated at ¥13,449 in 2005. In 2015, the figure was ￥33,554.87.

Air pollution 
According to a survey by "Global voices China" in February 2013, Handan was one of China's most polluted cities due to heavy industrial outputs.

However the government has made a significant effort to make the city cleaner, which involved closing down many polluting power plants. It is no longer the most polluted city, and, according to a 2016 government survey, the number of good air quality days is 189 days, an increase of 135 days compared with 2013.

Tourism 
Handan Prefecture is home to the AAAAA tourist attractions Guangfu Ancient City and the Nüwa Imperial Palace.

Transportation 
Handan is served by Handan Airport. Handan has two main train stations: one is Handan railway station which serves for the normal speed train, the other is named Handandong railway station, which serves for the high speed train.

Demographics

Ethnic minorities 
According to Handan government in 2007, 40 ethnic groups were present in Handan. Ethnic minorities represent 50,000 people, among which 48,000 Hui. There are 22 Hui schools and 5 Hui junior high schools in Handan.

Religion 
The most widespread religion in Handan is Chinese folk religion, including Taoism and Buddhism.

In 2013, there were more than 150,000 Catholics in Handan according to the Catholic Church, in the Roman Catholic Diocese of Yongnian. Mother of Grace Cathedral in Daming County was built in 1918. The most recent church was built in 2007.

There are also 300,000 Protestants. The largest Protestant church is on Qianjin Avenue and was built in 1997. The oldest church was on Congtai Street and was built in 1920. The church was destroyed in 2009 by the local government. A new church was built in 2011.

According to the local government 30,000 Hui Muslims live in the prefecture of Handan.

Culture

Idioms 
Handan is hailed as the capital of Chinese idioms. As a prosperous city and cultural center during the Warring States period, Handan attracted many scholars. Over 1,500 idioms and proverbs are attributed to the city. The following are some of the most well known idioms.

 (literally: "to study the walking method of Handan"), meaning to badly imitate others, and lose one's individuality in the process.
 (literally: "millet dream"), meaning a pipe dream.
 (literally: "stand upright on one's two legs between heaven and earth"), meaning to be fiercely independent.
 (literally: "to besiege the State of Wei to rescue the State of Zhao"), meaning to relieve a besieged ally by attacking the besiegers.
 (literally: "musn't speak of the two things on the same day"), meaning incomparable.
 (literally: "a bird frightened by the mere sound of shooting arrows"), a panic-stricken person.
 (literally: "when the snipe and the oyster fight, it is the fisherman that wins"), when two parties fight, it is always the third one who wins. King of Yan sent a representative to King Hui of Zhao to relay this message in order for him to rethink his plans of war.
 (literally: "drawn out and protracted"), meaning to be protracted.
 (literally: "returning the Jade to Zhao"), meaning to return something to its owner in good condition.
 (literally: "to be worth numerous contiguous cities"), meaning priceless.
 (literally: "one's hair raised to the hat in anger"), meaning to be furious.
 (literally: "carrying thorned grass and pleading guilt"), meaning to offer someone a humble apology.
 (literally: "to discuss military tactics on paper"), meaning to be an armchair strategist.
 (literally: "green is born of blue, but beats blue"), meaning to outmaster the teacher.

Notable people 
 Lian Po, a military general of Zhao. Regarded one of the four greatest generals of the Warring States period.
 Lin Xiangru, politician of the Warring States period. He's featured in two idioms, "Returning the Jade to Zhao" and "Carrying Thorned Grass and Pleading Guilt".
 Xun Kuang, Confucianism philosopher.
 Xu Huaizhong, novelist.
 Qin Shi Huang, founder of the Qin dynasty and was the first Emperor of China.
 Cao Cao, Han chancellor, poet, and warlord. One of the central figures of the Three Kingdoms period.
 Huang Hua, senior Communist Chinese revolutionary. The county-level city of Huanghua, Cangzhou, was named after him.
 Feng Jianming, literature scholar. 
 Fang Lijun, an artist based in Beijing.
 Yang Luchan, martial arts teacher.
 Deng Shu, father of Teresa Teng. He was a soldier of the Republic of China Armed Forces.
 Sun Qingmei, football player.
 Zhao Shi, football player.
 Zhang Weili, mixed martial artist, ring name "Magnum". She is the first ever Chinese and East Asian champion in UFC history.
 Chang Yongxiang, wrestler.

Sister cities 
  Kryvyi Rih, Dnipropetrovsk, Ukraine

References

External links 

 City of Handan, Official site 

 
Cities in Hebei
Prefecture-level divisions of Hebei